Edwin Clain (born 9 November 1999) is a French professional squash player. He competed at the 2018 Men's World Junior Squash Championships. He achieved his highest career PSA ranking of 167 in March 2021 during the 2020–21 PSA World Tour.

References

External links 
 
 

1999 births
Living people
French male squash players
Sportspeople from Créteil
21st-century French people